The Church of Jesus Christ of Latter-day Saints in Alaska refers to the Church of Jesus Christ of Latter-day Saints (LDS Church) and its members in Alaska. The first congregation of the Church in Alaska was organized in 1938. It has since grown to 33,250 members in 80 congregations.

Official church membership as a percentage of general population was 4.53% in 2014. According to the 2014 Pew Forum on Religion & Public Life survey, 5% of Alaskans self-identify themselves most closely with The Church of Jesus Christ of Latter-day Saints. The LDS Church is the 2nd largest denomination in Alaska behind the Roman Catholic Church.

History

The first members of LDS Church came to Alaska with the gold rush in 1898. One of these was Edward G. Cannon (1824-1910), a man originally from Kentucky who had served in the Mexican war and converted to The Church of Jesus Christ of Latter-day Saints on traveling to Utah in 1871. From 1871-1881 Cannon lived in Wanship, Utah. He then lived for nearly 20 years with a son of his in Indiana before migrating to Nome, Alaska. Cannon had worked as a farmer and medical doctor previously. He held various mining claims in the Nome area while there. He very vigorously sought to establish The Church of Jesus Christ of Latter-day Saints in Nome. In June 1902 Cannon baptized Kedzie N. Winnie (1874- ) a man born in Walton, New York. Winnie had come to Nome in the 1890s. In September 1902 Cannon ordained Winnie an Elder with the authorization of Melvin J. Ballard who as Northwestern States Mission president held ecclesiastical jurisdiction in the church over Alaska. Winnie worked closely with Cannon in preaching the gospel until Cannon's death in 1910. He then carried on his own vigorous campaign of preaching the restored gospel of Jesus Christ and regularly contributing articles on it to Nome newspapers until he chose to migrate to the body of the Church in Utah in 1913.

After Winnie left the Church had no organized presence in Alaska for 15 years. In 1927 William R. Sloan became president of the Northwestern States Mission and shortly after during a tour of the mission John A. Widstoe of the quorum of the 12 recommended to Sloan that missionary work be extended to Alaska. Sloan gave the assignment to open missionary work in Alaska to Alvin Englestead, a 36-year-old widower from Kanab, Utah who was serving in the Northwest states mission as a 2nd mission having previously served in Australia. Englestead recruited his stake president from Kanab, 59-year old Heber J. Meeks, to lead the effort, and 48-year old James Judd to also join the effort.

In 1981, special Church buildings designed for the Arctic weather were built.

One of the first smaller LDS Church temples was built in Anchorage in 1999. In 2016, the Alaska Bush Branch was formed with approximately 200 members from 36 families, and they meet Sunday mornings over the phone.

In January 2023, the church announced plans to rebuild the Anchorage Alaska Temple. This new building would be approximately 30,000 square feet, an increase from the 11,930 square foot temple that existed at the time of the announcement.

Borough Statistics
List of LDS Church adherents in each county as of 2010 according to the Association of Religion Data Archives:

Stakes

As of February 2023, there were 9 stakes in Alaska. A branch in Whitehorse, Yukon is part of the Juneau Alaska Stake.

Missions
The first two missionaries arrived in Juneau in 1913 where they worked for a few weeks.  The next missionaries, Elders Heber J. Meeks, Alvin Englestead, James Judd, and Lowell T. Plowman arrived in Alaska in 1928, under the direction of President William R. Sloan of the Northwestern States Mission.  From then on, there have been missionaries in Alaska.

Alaska has been part of several missions.  Alaska was part of the Northwestern States until 1941, when the Western Canadian was organized.  In 1960, the Alaska-Canadian Mission was organized.  It was renamed the Alaska-British Columbia Mission in 1970.  On October 15, 1974, the Alaska Anchorage Mission was organized - being the first mission to be based in the state.

Temples

On January 9, 1999, the Anchorage Alaska Temple was dedicated by President Gordon B. Hinckley.  After remodeling, President Hinckley rededicated the temple on February 8, 2004.
In January 2023, the church announced plans to rebuild the Anchorage Alaska Temple. This new building would be approximately 30,000 square feet, an increase from the 11,930 square foot temple that existed at the time of the announcement.

See also

The Church of Jesus Christ of Latter-day Saints membership statistics (United States)

References

External links
 Newsroom (Alaska)
 The story of Alaska Cultural presentation depicts LDS pioneers, Native Alaskans. Church News. Feb. 14, 2004 
 ComeUntoChrist.org Latter-day Saints Visitor site
 The Church of Jesus Christ of Latter-day Saints Official site

Latter Day Saint movement in Alaska
Alaska